This is a list of personnel who participated in the Monuments, Fine Arts, and Archives program under the Civil Affairs and Military Government Sections of the Allied armies between 1943 and 1946. "Expertise" attempts to indicate each person's background and suitability for MFAA at the time of their recruitment; many achieved even greater things in their later lives.

References

External links
  Monuments Men Web Site
  Monuments Men Foundation Official Web Site

Art and cultural repatriation after World War II
Restitution